Alexandros Soutzos (1758 – January 18/19, 1821, Bucharest) was a Phanariote Greek who ruled as Prince of Moldavia (July 10, 1801 – October 1, 1802 and Prince of Wallachia (July 2, 1802 – August 30, 1802; August 24, 1806 – October 15, 1806; December 1806;  November 17, 1818 – January 19, 1821). Born in Constantinople, he had earlier been Grand Dragoman of the Ottoman Empire.

References 

1758 births
1821 deaths
Rulers of Moldavia
Rulers of Wallachia
Rulers of Moldavia and Wallachia
Greek people of the Greek War of Independence
Wallachian people of the Greek War of Independence
Alexandros
Dragomans of the Porte
Dragomans of the Fleet
Constantinopolitan Greeks